Hadestown is a musical with music, lyrics and book by Anaïs Mitchell. It tells a version of the ancient Greek myth of Orpheus and Eurydice. Eurydice, a young girl looking for something to eat, goes to work in a hellish industrial version of the Greek underworld to escape poverty and the cold, and her poor singer-songwriter lover Orpheus comes to attempt to rescue her.

The original version of the musical premiered in the town of Barre, Vermont, in 2006, followed by a production in Vergennes, Vermont the same year and a tour between Vermont and Massachusetts in 2007. After the tour, Mitchell—unsure about the future of the musical—turned it into a concept album, released in 2010.

In 2012, Mitchell met director Rachel Chavkin, and the two started to rework the stage production, with additional songs and dialogue. The new version of the musical, developed for the stage and directed by Chavkin, premiered Off-Broadway at New York Theatre Workshop on May 6, 2016, and ran through July 31. Following productions in Edmonton and London, the show premiered in previews on Broadway in March 2019.

The Broadway production opened to critical acclaim and received numerous awards and nominations. At the 73rd Tony Awards, Hadestown received 14 nominations (the most for the evening) and won eight of them, including Best Musical and Best Original Score.

Synopsis

Act I 
The story begins with the Greek god Hermes introducing the characters ("Road to Hell"). This is followed by Eurydice and the Fates describing the harsh weather and famine of the setting ("Any Way the Wind Blows"). Orpheus, Hermes' ward, introduces himself to Eurydice and asks her to marry him ("Come Home With Me"). Eurydice is doubtful as they both live in poverty. Orpheus tells her that he is writing a song to make spring come again, and they will no longer have to struggle ("Wedding Song").

Orpheus sings the story of Hades and Persephone ("Epic I"). Persephone arrives in the world above and celebrates summertime ("Livin' it Up on Top"), while Eurydice begins to truly fall in love with Orpheus ("All I've Ever Known"). Hades comes early to collect Persephone, and she voices her misery of having to return to Hadestown, Hades' underground factory. Despite hearing about the never-ending labor endured by the factory workers, Eurydice is intrigued by the rich praises sung by the Fates as well as the promise of protection that Hadestown offers ("Way Down Hadestown"). The cold weather returns and Eurydice searches for food and firewood, urging Orpheus to finish his song ("A Gathering Storm"). Orpheus continues working on his song ("Epic II"), while Persephone and Hades argue ("Chant").

Hades leaves Hadestown to find someone who will appreciate its safety and security. He comes across a desperate Eurydice and invites her to come to Hadestown ("Hey, Little Songbird"). The Fates appear and urge Eurydice to join him ("When the Chips are Down"). With the cold surging on and an empty stomach, Eurydice sees no other choice except to follow Hades. She sings her goodbyes to Orpheus before heading to Hadestown as The Fates chastise the audience for judging her for choosing self-interest over love ("Gone, I'm Gone"). Orpheus discovers Eurydice's disappearance, and decides to rescue her from Hadestown. He sets off on his journey using Hermes' instructions on how to get to Hadestown without the use of the train ("Wait for Me"). Eurydice arrives in Hadestown and signs the contract, officially becoming a worker ("Why We Build the Wall").

Act II 
In an entr'acte, Persephone serves the workers in a speakeasy that she runs behind Hades's back ("Our Lady of the Underground"). Eurydice begins to realize the consequences of her choice to go to Hadestown: she will soon become a forgotten laborer and can never leave unless Hades consents to let her go ("Way Down Hadestown (Reprise)"). She sings of her regrets as her memories of the world above slowly begin to fade ("Flowers").

Orpheus arrives in Hadestown and promises Eurydice that he will take her home with him ("Come Home with Me (Reprise)"). Hades appears and reveals to him that Eurydice willingly signed the contract, which Eurydice regretfully confirms ("Papers"). Hades orders the workers to attack Orpheus and the Fates tell him to give up hope ("Nothing Changes"). Orpheus vows to find a way to free Eurydice, rallying up the workers and catching Persephone's attention in the process ("If It's True").

Persephone is inspired by Orpheus's determination and pleads with Hades to let Eurydice go ("How Long?"). While the workers begin to truly question the freedom they were promised, Hades bitterly offers Orpheus a chance to sing his completed song, threatening to kill him afterwards ("Chant (Reprise)"). Orpheus sings his song, reminding Hades of his love for Persephone ("Epic III"). Hades and Persephone reconcile, after which Orpheus and Eurydice promise to stay together no matter how hard ("Promises"). Orpheus asks Hades if they may leave, and Hades tells him that he has not reached a decision. The Fates taunt Hades for his dilemma: If he kills Orpheus and keeps Eurydice captive, they become martyrs, but if he lets them go, he loses control over his workers as they have begun to agitate for their freedom ("Word to the Wise"). Hades decides to let Orpheus and Eurydice go on one condition: Orpheus must lead them out. If he turns around to confirm that Eurydice is following him, she will return to Hadestown and remain there forever ("His Kiss, the Riot").

Hermes explains the condition to Orpheus and Eurydice, and they begin heading out with the workers looking to them for hope. Persephone and Hades decide to give their relationship another chance ("Wait for Me (Reprise)"). Orpheus makes it up to the end, where he is overcome by doubt and turns around, condemning Eurydice to return to Hadestown ("Doubt Comes In"). Hermes reflects on the somber tale and why it must be told, saying "That spring had come again, with a love song" ("Road to Hell (Reprise)"). After the bows at curtain call, the cast raises a cup to honor Orpheus ("We Raise Our Cups").

Musical numbers
Source:

New York Theatre Workshop, New York
Songs in this production were either new material or adapted from the 2010 concept album (besides "Any Way the Wind Blows," which is from Mitchell's later compilation album, Xoa.)

 Act I
 "Any Way the Wind Blows"† – The Fates, Eurydice
 "Road to Hell"‡ – Hermes, Company 
 "Come Home With Me"†‡ – Orpheus, Eurydice 
 "Wedding Song"† – Eurydice, Orpheus
 "Epic I"†‡ – Orpheus, Company 
 "Livin' it Up on Top"‡ – Persephone, Orpheus, Hermes, Company  
 "All I've Ever Known"‡ – Eurydice, Orpheus
 "Way Down Hadestown" – Hermes, Persephone, Orpheus, Eurydice, The Fates, Hades
 "Epic II" – Orpheus
 "Chant"‡ – Orpheus, Persephone, Hades, Eurydice, Company  
 "Hey, Little Songbird" – Hades, Eurydice 
 "When the Chips are Down" – The Fates, Eurydice 
 "Gone, I'm Gone" – Eurydice, The Fates
 "Wait for Me" – Orpheus, Hermes, Company 
 "Why We Build the Wall" – Hades, Company

 Act II
 "Our Lady of the Underground" – Persephone, Company 
 "Way Down Hadestown II"‡ – Hermes, Eurydice, The Fates
 "Flowers"† – Eurydice
 "Come Home With Me II"†‡ – Orpheus, Eurydice, The Fates
 "Papers"† – Hades, Hermes, Orpheus
 "Nothing Changes"† – The Fates
 "If It's True"† – Orpheus, Hermes
 "How Long?"† – Persephone, Hades
 "Chant" (reprise)‡ – Hermes, Orpheus, Hades, Persephone, Eurydice, The Fates
 "Epic III" – Orpheus, Hades, Company
 "Lover's Desire"† – Instrumental
 "Word to the Wise"‡ – The Fates
 "His Kiss, The Riot" – Hades
 "Promises"‡ – Orpheus, Eurydice
 "Wait for Me" (reprise)‡ – Hermes, Persephone, Hades, Eurydice, The Fates
 "Doubt Comes In" – The Fates, Orpheus, Eurydice
 "Road to Hell" (reprise)‡ – Hermes
 "I Raise My Cup"† – Persephone

† Not included on Original Cast Recording
‡ Original material

Citadel Theatre - Edmonton, Alberta, Canada

 Act I
 "Road to Hell I" – Hermes, Company
 "Any Way the Wind Blows" – Eurydice, Hermes, The Fates 
 "Come Home With Me I" – Orpheus, Eurydice 
 "Wedding Song" – Eurydice, Orpheus
 "Living It Up On Top" – Persephone, Orpheus, Hermes, Workers  
 "All I've Ever Known" – Eurydice, Orpheus
 "Way Down Hadestown I" – Hermes, Persephone, Orpheus, Eurydice, The Fates, Hades
 "Wind Theme" – Hermes, The Fates
 "Epic I" – Orpheus, Workers
 "Chant I" – Orpheus, Persephone, Hades, Eurydice, Hermes, The Fates, Workers 
 "Hey, Little Songbird" – Hades, Eurydice 
 "When the Chips are Down" – The Fates, Eurydice
 "Gone, I'm Gone" – Eurydice, The Fates
 "Wait for Me" – Orpheus, Hermes, Workers 
 "Why We Build the Wall" – Hades, Company

 Act II
 "Our Lady of the Underground" – Persephone, Company 
 "Way Down Hadestown II" – Hermes, Eurydice, The Fates, 
 "Flowers" – Eurydice
 "Come Home With Me II" – Orpheus, Eurydice, The Fates
 "Papers" – Hades, Hermes, Orpheus
 "Nothing Changes" – The Fates
 "If It's True" – Orpheus, Hermes
 "How Long?" – Persephone, Hades
 "Chant II" – Hermes, Orpheus, Hades, Persephone, Eurydice, Workers
 "Epic II" – Orpheus, Hades, Company
 "Lover's Desire" – Instrumental
 "Promises" – Orpheus, Eurydice
 "Word to the Wise" – The Fates
 "His Kiss, The Riot" – Hades
 "Wait for Me II" – Hermes, Persephone, Hades, Eurydice, Workers
 "Doubt Comes In" – The Fates, Orpheus, Eurydice
 "Road to Hell II" – Hermes
 "Curtain Call: I Raise My Cup" – Persephone

Walter Kerr Theatre - Broadway 
Source:

 Act I
 "Road to Hell" – Hermes, Orpheus, Company
 "Any Way the Wind Blows" – Hermes, The Fates, Eurydice, Orpheus
 "Come Home With Me" – Orpheus, Eurydice, Workers
 "Wedding Song" – Eurydice, Orpheus, Workers
 "Epic I" – Hermes, Orpheus
 "Livin' it Up on Top" – Hermes, Persephone, Orpheus, Workers
 "All I've Ever Known" – Eurydice, Orpheus, Hermes
 "Way Down Hadestown" – Hermes, Persephone, The Fates, Workers
 "A Gathering Storm" – Hermes, Eurydice, Orpheus, The Fates
 "Epic II" – Orpheus, Workers
 "Chant" – Persephone, Hades, Eurydice, Orpheus, Hermes, The Fates, Workers
 "Hey, Little Songbird" – Hades, Eurydice
 "When the Chips are Down" – The Fates, Eurydice, Hermes, Hades
 "Gone, I'm Gone" – Eurydice, The Fates
 "Wait for Me" – Hermes, Orpheus, The Fates, Workers
 "Why We Build the Wall" – Hades, Eurydice, Hermes, Persephone, Company

 Act II 
 "Our Lady of the Underground" – Persephone, Company
 "Way Down Hadestown (reprise)" – Fates, Eurydice, Hermes, Workers
 "Flowers" – Eurydice
 "Come Home With Me (reprise)" – Orpheus, Eurydice
 "Papers" – Hades, Hermes, Orpheus, Eurydice, Persephone
 "Nothing Changes" – The Fates
 "If It's True" – Orpheus, Hermes, Workers
 "How Long?" – Persephone, Hades
 "Chant (reprise)" – Hermes, Hades, Orpheus, Persephone, Eurydice, Workers
 "Epic III" – Orpheus, Hermes, Company
 "Promises" – Eurydice, Orpheus
 "Word to the Wise" – The Fates
 "His Kiss, the Riot" – Hades
 "Wait for Me (reprise)" – Hermes, Orpheus, Eurydice, Persephone, Hades, The Fates, Workers
 "Doubt Comes In" – The Fates, Orpheus, Eurydice, Workers
 "Road to Hell (reprise)" – Hermes, Company
 "We Raise our Cups" – Persephone, Eurydice, Company

Productions 

Hadestown was performed as a stage production in the cities of Barre and Vergennes in 2006, before going into a seven-day, ten-city tour between Mitchell's home state of Vermont and Massachusetts in 2007. Mitchell described the first incarnation of the show as "a D.I.Y. theatre project." The creative team included primary orchestrator/arranger Michael Chorney and original director/designer Ben T. Matchstick, as well as a cast drawn from local artists in Vermont. In 2010, a concept album was released.

In her search for a director, Mitchell sought out Rachel Chavkin in 2012 after watching a production of Natasha, Pierre & the Great Comet of 1812 that she had directed. In the transition from concept album to stage musical, Mitchell wrote an additional 15 songs and added dialogue to clarify the plot and deepen characterization. The 15 new songs were developed after Mitchell and Chavkin discussed gaps in the album's storyline. Michael Chorney created the primary orchestrations and arrangements, with Todd Sickafoose contributing additional/co-arrangements and orchestrations. Hadestown premiered at New York Theatre Workshop for an initial run from May 3 through July 3, 2016, but was later extended due to popular demand through July 31. The production starred Damon Daunno as Orpheus, Nabiyah Be as Eurydice, Amber Gray as Persephone, Patrick Page as Hades, Chris Sullivan as Hermes, and Lulu Fall, Jessie Shelton, and Shaina Taub as the Fates.

On October 14, 2016, an EP was released featuring four songs from the musical, recorded live on June 28 and 29, 2016. A full live album was released on October 6, 2017.

Hadestown was presented in an intended pre-Broadway run as part of the 2017/2018 season at Citadel Theatre in Edmonton, Alberta, Canada. Rachel Chavkin once again served as director, with performances scheduled for November 11 – December 3, 2017, with Amber Gray and Patrick Page reprising their roles from NYTW. The production was presented in collaboration with Mara Isaacs and Dale Franzen, who produced the Off-Broadway run. The NYTW production was also featured in the award-winning documentary series Working in the Theatre produced by the American Theatre Wing.

Ahead of a 2019 Broadway transfer, Hadestown was performed in the Olivier Theatre of the National Theatre in London. Making its UK debut, it ran from November 2, 2018, to January 26, 2019. The production team included Rachel Hauck for scenic design, Michael Krass for costume design, Bradley King for lighting design, Nevin Steinberg and Jessica Paz for sound design, David Neumann for choreography, and Liam Robinson for musical direction. Page, Gray, and Reeve Carney reprised their performances in the National Theatre production, joined by Eva Noblezada, André De Shields (who had participated in some early workshops of the production), Carly Mercedes Dyer, Rosie Fletcher, and Gloria Onitiri.

Hadestown opened on Broadway at the Walter Kerr Theatre, with previews beginning on March 22, 2019, and opening night set for April 17, 2019. Page, Gray, De Shields, Carney, and Noblezada reprised their performances for the Broadway production, and were joined by Jewelle Blackman, Yvette Gonzales-Nacer, and Kay Trinidad. The Broadway production was produced by Mara Isaacs, Dale Franzen, Hunter Arnold and Tom Kirdahy. The production team also reunited Hauck for scenic design, Krass for costume design, King for lighting design, Steinberg and Jessica Paz for sound design, Neumann for choreography, and Robinson for musical direction. On March 12, 2020, performances were suspended due to the COVID-19 pandemic The musical resumed performances on September 2, 2021. On January 4, 2023, Hadestown became the longest-running show at the Walter Kerr Theatre with 918 performances.

In August 2019, it was announced during an episode of Good Morning America that Hadestown would begin a national tour in 2020. Due to the COVID-19 pandemic, the tour was postponed to 2021. The tour launched at the John F. Kennedy Center for the Performing Arts in Washington, D.C., and ran for three weeks starting October 15, 2021. Prior to the tour launch, the production had a tryout at the Peace Center in Greenville, South Carolina, from October 5 to 10, 2021. The national tour initially starred Nicholas Barasch as Orpheus, Morgan Siobhan Green as Eurydice, Kevyn Morrow as Hades, Kimberly Marable (a cast member from the original Broadway cast) as Persephone, Levi Kreis as Hermes, and Belén Moyano, Bex Odorisio, and Shea Renne as the Fates.

A South Korean production of Hadestown ran from August 24, 2021 to February 27, 2022 at the LG Arts Center, Seoul. This Korean-language production is the first international staging of the musical, and starred Zo Hyung-gyun, Park Kang-hyun, and Xiumin rotating as Orpheus, and Kim Hwan-hee and Kim Soo-ha rotating as Eurydice. This production won Best Musical, Best Male Lead and Best Female Supporting Role at the Korea Musical Awards.

Casts

Notable replacements 
Broadway (2019–)
Hades: Tom Hewitt
Persephone: Lana Gordon
Hermes: Lillias White
North American Tour (2021–)
Persephone: Maria-Christina Oliveras, Lana Gordon
Hermes: Nathan Lee Graham
Hades: Michael Patrick Quinn

Recordings 

While not a full recording of the musical, Mitchell's 2007 album The Brightness contains the song "Hades & Persephone", an early version of "How Long?"

Mitchell released a concept album based on the musical, working on it for over a year. It was released on March 9, 2010, through Righteous Babe Records.

A live cast recording of the Off-Broadway production was released digitally and on CD on October 6, 2017, through Parlophone Records. A four-track EP entitled Why We Build The Wall (Selections from Hadestown. The Myth. The Musical. Live Original Cast Recording) was released for digital retailers on October 13, 2016, in promotion of the album.

A Broadway cast recording was released in full on July 26, 2019, through Sing It Again Records. A physical two-CD recording would be available at a later date. A holiday album recorded by Blackman, Gonzalez-Nacer and Trinidad titled If the Fates Allow, was released on November 20, 2020 and features guest contributions from the other original cast members.

Themes
Writer Anaïs Mitchell said she was inspired by Les Misérables to write a musical that was about the power of both romance and politics: "It’s a love story, but politics really is romantic."

Director Rachel Chavkin said addressing climate change had always been central to the show: "As we thought more and more about shaping the world that Eurydice and Orpheus are living in — a world caused, in Greek mythological terms, by the decay of the ancient marriage between Hades and Persephone, a world that is out of balance, where it is either freezing or blazing hot, where food becomes scarcer and the idea of stability becomes harder to imagine, and a character, Eurydice, who has spent her life running — all of those things kind of crystallized while we were making the show." The show did a joint promotion with Natural Resources Defense Council to raise awareness and bring a greater sense of urgency to the push for action on the issue of climate change.

US cultural commentator Bridget Read highlights the economic themes: "Orpheus and Eurydice’s tragedy becomes, in the hands of Mitchell, an argument for collective bargaining...I don’t think its untoward of me to hear the class politics in a musical in which the characters sing the word poverty more times than I’ve ever heard it before in the vicinity of Times Square." In China, The Paper has published a review of Hadestown, "The Realm Underneath: Hadestown and Utopia" (《冥界》：地狱镇与乌托邦) by historian Hansong Li (李汉松), who frames the musical as a work of not only musical ingenuity but also social critique.

Todd Osborne comments on the self-conscious significance of the medium of song within the work: "It is a musical both about how art can save us and how, especially in an apocalyptic world, hope might be the only thing we have left."

It is said many times in the musical "(Orpheus) could make you see how the world could be in spite of the way that it is". This implies that we should look to the future and what could happen no matter how dark it gets.

Reception 
The New York Times described the Off-Broadway production as "inventive" and "gorgeously sung," praising its simplicity and intimacy. The Hollywood Reporter described the added dialogue as "wince-inducing" but favored its high energy and immersive staging. Several reviews drew parallels between the song "Why We Build the Wall" and Donald Trump's 2016 presidential campaign, though the song predates the campaign by about a decade.

The production opened on Broadway on April 17, 2019 to critical acclaim, with praise for its direction and the performance of André De Shields. The New York Times called it "gorgeous" and "hypnotic", especially noting its improvement from the New York Theatre Workshop version. David Rooney of The Hollywood Reporter calls it "utterly fabulous", in particular praising the performances of Gray and Page.

Japanese producer Imura Madoka (井村まどか) and theatre journalist Yusei Kageyama (影山雄成) praised the musical for its novelty and creativity, in contrast to a recent trend in Broadway to "avoid risks" by adapting films and recasting classics.

Awards and nominations

Off-Broadway production

Edmonton production

Broadway production

References

External links 
 Official website
 Tiny Desk Concert [26:23] at NPR Music on 2020-03-02
 

Orpheus
2016 musicals
Broadway musicals
Off-Broadway musicals
Sung-through musicals
Greek underworld in popular culture
Classical mythology in popular culture
Musicals about the Great Depression
Tony Award for Best Musical
Tony Award-winning musicals